The Vijay for Best Début Actor is given by Vijay sethupathy as part of its annual Vijay Awards ceremony for Tamil (Kollywood) films.

The list
Here is a list of the award winners and the films for which they won.

Nominations
2007 Karthi – Paruthiveeran
Aadhi – Mirugam
Akhil – Kalloori
Shiva – Chennai 600028
Vinay Rai – Unnale Unnale
2008 Shanthnoo Bhagyaraj – Sakkarakatti
Ajmal Ameer – Anjathey
Krishna Sekhar – Alibhabha 
Sasikumar – Subramaniyapuram
2009 Vimal – Pasanga
Johnny – Renigunta
Ramakrishnan – Kunguma Poovum Konjum Puravum
Tharun Gopi – Mayandi Kudumbathar
Vishnu Vishal – Vennila Kabadi Kuzhu
2010 Vidharth – Mynaa
Adharvaa – Baana Kaathadi
Arulnidhi – Vamsam
Mahesh – Angaadi Theru
Myshkin – Nandhalala
2011 Nani – Veppam
Krishna – Seedan
Jeyanth – Marghazhi
Shabarish – Markandeyan
Veera Bahu – Nadunisi Naaygal
2012 Vikram Prabhu – Kumki
Sivakarthikeyan  – Marina
Dinesh – Attakathi
Udhayanidhi Stalin – Oru Kal Oru Kannadi
Sri – Vazhakku Enn 18/9
 2013 Gautham Karthik – Kadal
 Ashok Selvan – Pizza II: Villa
 Sundeep Kishan – Yaaruda Mahesh
 Nivin Pauly – Neram
 Sathya – Puthagam
 2014 Dulquer Salmaan – Vaayai Moodi Pesavum
 Chandran – Kayal
 Naga – Pisaasu
 Abhinay Vaddi – Ramanujan
 Santhosh Prathap – Kathai Thiraikathai Vasanam Iyakkam

See also
 Tamil cinema
 Cinema of India

References

Debut Actor
Film awards for male debut actors